The Golden Eagle Award for Best Cinematography is one of twenty award categories presented annually by the National Academy of Motion Pictures Arts and Sciences of Russia. It is one of the Golden Eagle Awards, which were conceived by Nikita Mikhalkov as a counterweight to the Nika Award established in 1987 by the Russian Academy of Cinema Arts and Sciences.

Each year the members of the academy choose three leading cinematographers and the film as a perception. The first cameraman to be awarded was Yuri Nevsky for the film The Star. The most recent award was made to Igor Grinyakin for Union of Salvation.

Nomineess and Awardees
Key

External links

References

Cinematography
Lists of films by award
Awards for best cinematography